Ain Sinan is a village on the north coast of Qatar, located in the municipality of Al Shamal. Historically, the village has been mainly inhabited by members of the Al-Rashed tribe.

Etymology
Ain Sinan gets its name from a man named Sinan, who built a well and farm in the area.

History
In J.G. Lorimer's Gazetteer of the Persian Gulf, Ain Sinan was described as a village 4 miles southwest of Fuwayrit which contained a fort with a 35 feet deep masonry well. The fort was said to have been built by the Al-Maadeed tribe. After the Al Maadeed abandoned the area, the fort was held by the Bu Kuwara tribe of Fuwayrit as a means to secure its water supply.

The village was demarcated in 1992.

Infrastructure
The nearest health center is 15 km away in Madinat Al Kaaban. There is no secondary school in the village; high school students typically commute to Madinat ash Shamal, 25 km away.

Ain Sinan Park was opened in 2013, and covers an area of 5152 meters. It has a children's play area, a cafeteria, and features 15 different species of trees and shrubs.

Geography
Ain Sinan is situated near the north-eastern tip of Qatar, about 70 km away from capital Doha. The village of Al Zarqaa is nearby.

In the past, villages situated directly on the coast such as Al Ghariyah and Fuwayrit experienced water shortages because seawater prevented direct access to the groundwater. Additionally, the water that could be obtained was of poor quality. Therefore, Ain Sinan would establish a trade relationship with these villages in which it would receive sea goods such as fish and pearls in exchange for its potable water.

References

External links
 Geographic.org

Populated places in Al Shamal